Hoang Anh Gia Lai Football Club, commonly known as Hoang Anh Gia Lai and simply known as HAGL, is a Vietnamese professional football club based in Pleiku, Gia Lai. Owned by Đoàn Nguyên Đức, a prominent Vietnamese businessman and founder of Hoang Anh Gia Lai Group, HAGL play in the top division of Vietnamese football, V.League 1. Their home stadium is Pleiku Stadium.

Current coaching staff

Current squad

Out on loan

Retired numbers

Continental record

Honours

Hoang Anh Gia Lai Football Club

National competitions
League
V.League 1:
 Winners:       2003, 2004
 Third place: 2007, 2013
Cup
Vietnamese Super Cup:
 Winners: 2003, 2004
Vietnamese Cup:
 Runners-up: 2010
 Third place: 2014, 2022

Other competitions
ASEAN Club Championship:
 Third place: 2005
BTV Cup:
 Winners : 2018
Quang Trung Emperor's Cup:
 Winners: 2022

Record as V.League member

Head coach history
Head coaches by Years (2003–present)

Notable players

Domestic players

 Phung Van Nhien
 Lee Nguyen
 Nguyễn Văn Đàn
 Nguyễn Hữu Đang

Foreign players

Kit manufacturers and shirt sponsors

Results and fixtures

References

External links
Official website

Pleiku
Football clubs in Vietnam
Association football clubs established in 2001
2001 establishments in Vietnam
Hoang Anh Gia Lai FC